Dardan Feim Karimani (born 23 November 1998) is a professional footballer who plays as a midfielder for Regionalliga Bayern club Würzburger Kickers. Born in Germany, he has represented Albania at youth level.

Early life
Karimani was born in Soest, Germany from Kosovo Albanian parents from Mitrovica, Kosovo.

Club career
In summer 2014 Karimani signed with 3. Liga club SC Paderborn 07 from Borussia Dortmund.

In January 2019, after featuring for Paderborn's reserves, Karimani joined Regionalliga West side SC Verl on a free transfer.

On 25 May 2022, Karimani signed a one-year contract with recently relegated Regionalliga Bayern club Würzburger Kickers.

International career

Albania

Under-19
On 7 January 2015. Karimani made his debut with Albania U19 in a friendly match against Italy U18 after being named in the starting line-up, he could not be part of Albania national youth teams because of the lack of an Albanian passport even though the president through a decree has decided that Karimani had been provided with a passport.

Kosovo

Under-21
On 30 August 2018. Karimani received a call-up from Kosovo U21 for a 2019 UEFA European Under-21 Championship qualification match against Republic of Ireland U21.

References

External links

1998 births
Living people
People from Soest, Germany
Sportspeople from Arnsberg (region)
Footballers from North Rhine-Westphalia
Kosovo Albanians
Kosovan footballers
Albanian footballers
Albania youth international footballers
German footballers
German people of Kosovan descent
German people of Albanian descent
Association football midfielders
SC Paderborn 07 players
Borussia Dortmund players
SC Verl players
SV Lippstadt 08 players
Würzburger Kickers players
3. Liga players
Regionalliga players